XHZN-FM/XEZN-AM is a combo radio station in Celaya, Guanajuato, Mexico. Broadcasting on 104.5 FM and 780 AM, XHZN/XEZN carries the national Exa FM format from MVS Radio.

History
Impulsora de Radiodifusión, S.A., received a concession for XEZN-AM on 780 kHz in 1974. The FM station was added in 1994, originally broadcasting on 99.3 but later moved.

The concessionaire was Radio XHOZ-FM since 1996 until 2016, when it changed its name to FM Celaya. Impulsora de Radiodifusión owned XHOZ-FM in Querétaro until 2006.

References

Radio stations in Guanajuato
Spanish-language radio stations
Contemporary hit radio stations in Mexico
Celaya